Ghana–Russia relations are the bilateral relationship between the two countries, Ghana and Russia. Russia has an embassy in Accra, and Ghana has an embassy in Moscow. Relations are still very friendly and close.

Bilateral Relations
The links between the two countries particularly dynamic growth in the years of the first president of Ghana Kwame Nkrumah who ruled from 1957 to 1966.

In 1997, the Ghana delegation visited the Council of Federation of the Federal Assembly of the Russian Federation. In 2003, a visit by the delegation of the State Duma of the Russian Federation headed by its deputy chairman A. N. Chilingarovym. In 2004, the Russian Federation, a delegation of the Parliament of Ghana, led by Speaker P. A. Adzheteem.
Russia and Ghana actively cooperate in the UN and other international organizations. In February 2004, the New York Deputy Minister of Foreign Affairs of the Russian Federation Alexander Saltanov had a conversation with the Foreign Minister of Ghana Nana Akufo-Addo. In October 2004, Deputy Minister of Foreign Affairs of the Russian Federation Yuri Fedotov visited Ghana.
In June 2007, "in the margins" of the summit of the Group of Eight took place in Heiligendamm brief meeting between Vladimir Putin and President of Ghana John Kufuor.
The practice of bilateral political consultations between the Foreign Ministry. In January 2006, in Accra, at the election of Ghana 2006–2007. of the UN Security Council as a non-permanent member, holds Russian-Ghanaian consulting the UN agenda.
In July 2007, the Foreign Ministers of Ghana Nana Akufo-Addo working visit to Moscow, during which a protocol was signed ministerial consultations (last consultation was held September 16, 2011).

In an interview with the Ghana News Agency in Accra, Valery Orlov, Russia's ambassador to Ghana, reaffirmed the Russian government's intention to deepen relations with Ghana in the interests of both countries and support the development of the African continent. He said he believes that the important events that have taken place between the two countries over the years will give new dimensions to their traditional friendship and deepen the ties between them. 

In the spring of 2016, the Ghanaian Embassy in Moscow organized a symposium, which was attended by diplomats, prominent international traders and analysts, as well as Ghanaian citizens living in the Russian Federation. The symposium was part of the Independence Day celebrations in Moscow. The meeting was chaired by the Ambassador Extraordinary and Plenipotentiary of the Republic of Ghana to the Russian Federation, Kozo Kpoku Alabo.

See also
Foreign relations of Ghana
Foreign relations of Russia

References

External links

  Documents on the Ghana–Russia relationship from the Russian Ministry of Foreign Affairs
  Embassy of Russia in Accra

 
Africa–Russia relations
Russia
Bilateral relations of Russia